João Duarte Coelho do Sameiro Espregueira-Mendes is a Portuguese orthopaedic surgeon, specialized in sports orthopaedics, traumatology and knee surgery. During his career, he has been engaged in scientific research, university teaching, the leadership of both national and international scientific societies and clinical practice as Clinical Director of the Clinica do Dragão, Espregueira-Mendes Sports Centre – FIFA Medical Centre of Excellence.

Early life
João Duarte Espregueira-Mendes was born in Porto, on the 5th of March 1960. He spent his early life in Porto dedicated to the practice of tennis, mini golf and submarine star fishing. Initiated his studies at the École Française de Porto and completed his undergraduate studies at the António Nobre High School. In 1985, João Duarte Espregueira-Mendes finishes his MD degree at Faculty of Medicine of the University of Porto having, since early, conjugated his professional activity with the academic career. Respecting the family tradition, the eldest son of João Manuel Ortigão Duarte Espregueira-Mendes represents the third orthopaedic generation of Espregueira-Mendes’ family, following the steps of his father and his grandfather 
João de Espregueira-Mendes.  In 1995, he held Ph.D. exams in Orthopaedics and Traumatology at the same faculty with the thesis entitle “Chronic lesions of the anterior cruciate ligament”.  In the same year, he was approved with distinction and commendation within the speciality of Orthopaedics, achieving a final perfect score by unanimity (20/20).

Career
In 1998, João made his application for the direction of the Orthopaedics and Traumatology department at São Sebastião Hospital in Santa Maria da Feira, where he conceived and organized from scratch, the entire Orthopaedics service. In 2005, he begins to teach at Minho University, being the head of the department of Orthopaedics and Traumatology. It is also in this year that Clínica do Dragão is inaugurated, a health project created to meet all the medical needs of major specialties, with a particular focus in Orthopaedics and Traumatology and Sports Medicine, represented by Espregueira Mendes Sports Centre. The clinic acquires the international certification of ESSKA - European Society of Sports Traumatology, Knee Surgery and Arthroscopy - and ISAKOS - International Society of Arthroscopy, Knee Surgery and Orthopaedic Sports Medicine.  João Duarte Espregueira-Mendes was the first Portuguese president of this scientific society (2012-2014) and during his mandate he accomplished the creation, among other achievements, of the ESSKA Foundation in Luxembourg, the Journal of Experimental Orthopaedics, the ESSKA Academy and the Porto Award prize. In 2012, João Duarte Espregueira-Mendes is named an honorary member of the Portuguese Society of Arthroscopy and Sports Traumatology (SPAT), the Bulgarian Orthopaedics and Traumatology Association (BOTA) and the Spanish Society of the Knee (SEROD). In 2013, the Clínica do Dragão, Espregueira-Mendes Sports Centre receives the most important international recognition, which sums up his excelling services, developed worldwide in the field of Sports Medicine: the FIFA Medical Centre of Excellence certificate. FIFA has thus distinguished Clinic under direction of Professor João Espregueira-Mendes, which became the first to receive such recognition in the Iberian Peninsula and a unique case in Portugal. Along his life, João Duarte Espregueira-Mendes has been deeply involved in his community and the city of Porto, being actively involved in several social and beneficiary events. He sponsors "Lar Luisa Canavarro" (former "Abrigo Maternal do Dr. João de Espregueira Mendes") and "Espaço João Espregueira-Mendes" art gallery in FC Porto museum.

Appointments

Current appointments
 Professor at the Medical School of Minho University, as member of the Coordination of the Surgical Area and Head Locomotor System Department
 Treasurer of the International Society of Arthroscopy, Knee Surgery and Orthopaedic Sports Medicine (ISAKOS)
 President of the Publication Committee of ISAKOS
 Professor of Orthopaedics and Traumatology at the Faculty of Medicine at Porto University.
 Senior Researcher at the 3B's Research Group – Biomaterials, Biodegradables and Biomimetics – Department of Polymer Engineering, Minho University.
 Coordinator of the Postgraduation on Sports and Exercise Medicine of the Faculty of Medicine of the Porto University.
 Member of the consultee board of the FC Porto.
 Clinical Director of the Saúde Atlântica Group.
 Clinical Director of the Espregueira-Mendes Sports Centre – FIFA Medical Centre of Excellence - Estádio do Dragão - Porto .
 Direction member of the Patellofemoral Foundation.
 Invited professor at Kobe University, Japan
 Invited professor at Marmara University - Istanbul.
 Member of the ACL Study Group (since 2013).

Past appointments
 Member of the Organizing Committee of the 11th ESSKA Congress at Atenas in May 2000
 Vice-president of the Portuguese Association of Arthroscopy and Traumatology from 2000 to 2004.
 Scientific Committee of the Latin American Society of Knee and Sports (SLARD) in representation of the Portuguese Association of Arthroscopy and Traumatology – 2004.
 President of the Portuguese Society of Arthroscopy and Sports Traumatology (SPAT) - 2004–2008.
 Member of the Organizing Committee of the 12th ESSKA Congress at Innsbruck in May 2006.
 Member of the Organizing Committee of the Portuguese Association of Arthroscopy and Traumatology Congress as invited society of the Spanish Association of Arthroscopy at Léon in May 2006.
 Treasurer of the European Society of Knee Surgery, Sports Trauma and Arthroscopy (ESSKA) - 2006–2008.
 Chair of the Postgraduation in Sports Rehabilitation of the Fernando Pessoa University - 2006–2011.
 President of the 13th ESSKA Congress at Porto in May 2008.
 2º Vice-president of the European Society of Knee Surgery, Sports Trauma and Arthroscopy (ESSKA) - 2008–2010.
 Scientific Committee of the 10º National Congress of Sports Medicine at Lisbon - 2010.
 Vice-president of the European Society of Knee Surgery, Sports Trauma and Arthroscopy (ESSKA) - 2010–2012.
 Member of the Education Committee da International Society of Knee Surgery and Arthroscopy (ISAKOS).
 Direction member of the Portuguese Society of Orthopaedics and Traumatology.
 Vice-president of the Education Committee of the International Society of Knee Surgery and Arthroscopy (ISAKOS) - 2011- 2013.
 President of the European Society of Knee Surgery, Sports Trauma and Arthroscopy (ESSKA) - 2012-2014
 President of the European Society of Sports Traumatology, Knee Surgery and Arthroscopy (ESSKA) Foundation - 2012-2014
 Godfather of the Latin American Society of Knee and Sports (SLARD) - 2014
 Godfather of the American Orthopaedic Society for Sports Medicine (AOSSM) - 2015

Awards
 Prize at the 4th Course for Continental Surgeons - Royal National Orthopaedic Hospital, London - 1991.
 First Portuguese Orthopedist to achieve a scholarship at the Mayo Clinic - Rochester - EUA
 Best article at the Portuguese Journal of Orthopaedics and Traumatology - Revista Portuguesa de Ortopedia e Traumatologia - 1993.
 Scholarship of the Association des Orthopedistes de Langue Française.
 Award Prof. Jorge Mineiro in 1995.
 Award Prof. Carlos Lima, for the first time in 1998.
 Award J.M. Espregueira Mendes of the Knee Pathology Section of the Portuguese Society of Orthopaedics and Traumatology (SPOT) - 2000.
 Honorable mention of the best oral communication at the Portuguese National Congress of Orthopaedics - 2003.
 Award Jorge Mineiro with the paper Regeneration of human meniscus by tissue engineering. A new cellular and acellular approach. [Regeneração do menisco humano por engenharia de tecidos. Nova abordagem celular e acelular] - 2011.
 Award BES Inovação with the Porto Knee Testing Device (PKTD) invention - 2012.
 Honorary member of the Portuguese Society of Arthroscopy and Sports Traumatology (SPAT) - 2012.
 Honorary member of the Bulgarian Orthopaedic and Trauma Association (BOTA) - 2014.
 Honorary member of the Spanish Society of the Knee (SEROD) - 2017

Research activities
Alongside with the clinical practice, João Duarte Espregueira-Mendes has an intense academic and research activity, with more than 400 oral presentations, more than 250 national and international publications, including many books and book chapters published.

Books: editor and co-editor
 Co-Editor of the book “O Joelho”, Lidel publisher, prepared by the Portuguese Society of Arthroscopy and Sports Traumatology (SPAT) & Espregueira-Mendes - 2006
 Co-Editor of the book “O Ombro”, Lidel, prepared by the Portuguese Society of Arthroscopy and Sports Traumatology (SPAT) & Espregueira-Mendes - 2009
 Co-Editor of the book “Meniscal Transplantation”, Springer - 2013.
 Co-Editor of the book “ESSKA Instructional Course Lecture Book Amsterdam 2014”, Springer - 2014
 Co-Editor of the book “The Patellofemoral Joint: State of the Art in Evaluation and Management”, Springer – 2014
 Co-Editor of the book “Motor Skills Training in Orthopedic Sports Medicine”, Springer - 2017
 Co-Editor of the book “Bio-orthopaedics: A New Approach”, Springer – 2017
 Editor-in-Chief of the book “Injuries and Health Problems in Football: What Everyone Should Know”, Springer - 2017

Patents
 Scaffold that enables segmental vascularization for the engineering of complex tissue and methods of making the same, 2013
 Dynamic osteotomy plate including devices apparatus and methods using such a plate, 2014
 Multi-joint device for objective measurement of laxity and cartilage damage, 2014
 Arthritis treatment, 2014
 Products for repairing cartilage lesions, method of preparation and uses thereof, 2014
 Viscosupplement composition comprising ulvan for treating arthritis, 2015

References

1960 births
Living people
People from Porto
Portuguese orthopaedic surgeons
Portuguese sports physicians
Traumatologists